The following is a list of Philippine television ratings for 2008 coming from AGB Nielsen Philippines.

Mega Manila accounts for about 48% of total TV households in urban Philippines. The Mega Manila and Luzon markets combined account for about 76% of the total TV households in urban Philippines. Non-urban households aren't included in both Mega Manila and NUTAM surveys.

The largest television market is at Mega Manila; in AGB-Nielsen's case, Mega Manila consists of Metro Manila, Bulacan, Rizal, Cavite and Laguna. Metro Manila and other urban areas in the Philippines comprise the National Urban Television Audience Measurement (NUTAM) and are scattered throughout the country.

Markets

Note that the National Urban Television Audience Measurement (NUTAM) does not represent the entire Philippines but only urban areas; NUTAM markets comprise 39% of the entire country. The Mega Manila market comprises 52% of the NUTAM market.

National Urban Television Audience Measurement
In national urbal Philippines, the three Manny Pacquiao boxing bouts scored the highest ratings, each surpassing 45%, making GMA airing the top three aired programs in urban Philippines. The finales of Pinoy Big Brother: Teen Edition Plus and Pinoy Dream Academy were next, and the finale of MariMar rounded up the top 5.

Most watched programs

Mega Manila

Weekly ratings
Week 1 began on December 30, 2007 and ended on January 5, 2008. The list will be updated every Sunday, when the week ends.

AGB Nielsen defines "non-primetime" as prior to 6:30 pm and "primetime" as after 6:30 pm up to sign-off.

GMA almost swept the weekly non-primetime and primetime races, if not for ABS-CBN's broadcast of the Hatton-Malinggagi bout that beat the GMA programs for the week of November 23–29. ABS-CBN fared better in weekend programming, but generally, ratings during the weekend are lower than their weekday counterparts.

ABS-CBN won the primetime race during these days, all of them occurred during the weekend:
June 7: Airing of Pinoy Big Brother: Teen Edition Plus: The Big Night
June 8: Airing of Pinoy Big Brother: Teen Edition Plus: The Big Reunion
August 3: Airing of Pinoy Dream Academy: Little Dreamers
August 24: Airing of Pinoy Dream Academy: Little Dreamers
September 13 and 14: Airing of Pinoy Dream Academy
September 28: Airing of Pinoy Dream Academy: Little Dreamers
October 5: Airing of Pinoy Dream Academy: Little Dreamers
October 11: Airing of Maalaala Mo Kaya
October 19: Airing of Rated K

Aside from Manny Pacquiao's bouts, two programs starring Marian Rivera, Marimar and Dyesebel were the top-rating programs of the year, rating between the high-thirties and the mid-forties; in fact, ABS-CBN closed the gap whenever Marian Rivera's programs are not on-air.

Eat Bulaga! remains the most consistent non-primetime program, despite being challenged by GMA's Sine Novelas.

No ratings were published on March 20–22 (Holy Week), August 25 and September 29.

See also
AGB Nielsen Philippine TV ratings controversy

References

PEP.PH

External links
AGB Nielsen corporate website
AGB-NMR Philippines official website (NUTAM)
 Philippine Entertainment Portal - TV section

Ratings 2008
Ratings 2008
Ratings 2008